Lifted is the fifth studio album by American singer-songwriter Israel Nash. It was released on July 27, 2018 under Loose Music.

Production
The album was recorded at Israel Nash's studio Plum Creek Studio in Dripping Springs, Texas.

Critical reception
Lifted was met with "generally favorable" reviews from critics. At Metacritic, which assigns a weighted average rating out of 100 to reviews from mainstream publications, this release received an average score of 79, based on 7 reviews. Aggregator Album of the Year gave the release a 76 out of 100 based on a critical consensus of 4 reviews.

Track listing

References

2018 albums
Israel Nash albums
Loose Music albums